Ceratophyllus celsus is a species of flea in the family Ceratophyllidae. It was described by Karl Jordan in 1926.

References 

Ceratophyllidae
Insects described in 1926